Sessea is a genus of 19 accepted species of shrubs, small trees and climbers belonging to the subfamily Cestroideae of the plant family Solanaceae. The flowers of Sessea are so similar to those of Cestrum that the genera cannot usually be told apart, unless the plants are in fruit. Then their distinguishing characteristics become immediately apparent; plants of the genus Sessea bearing dehiscent capsules dispersing winged seeds, while those belonging to the genus Cestrum bear juicy berries containing prismatic seeds. The flowers of both Sessea and Cestrum have tubular corollas that are long exserted from small calyces.

Taxonomy
The genus commemorates Spanish botanist Martín Sessé y Lacasta, was described by Nicholas Edward Brown and was published in Florae Peruvianae, et Chilensis Prodromus 21,1794 by Hipólito Ruiz López and José Antonio Pavón Jiménez. The type species is: Sessea stipulata Ruiz & Pav.

Species
Sessea andina Francey	 
Sessea brasiliensis Toledo
Sessea colombiana Francey
Sessea confertiflora Francey	
Sessea corymbiflora Goudot ex Rich. Taylor & R. Phillips
Sessea crassivenosa Bitter
Sessea dependens Ruiz & Pav.	
Sessea discolor Francey	
Sessea farinosa (Urb. & Ekman) Francey	
Sessea graciliflora Bitter
Sessea herzogii  Dammer	
Sessea macrophylla Francey
Sessea multinervia Francey
Sessea pedicellata Francey
Sessea regnellii  Taub.
Sessea sodiroi Bitter native to Ecuador
Sessea stipulata Ruiz & Pav.	
Sessea tipocochensis (Werderm.) Francey
Sessea weberbaueri  Bitter

References

Cestroideae
Solanaceae genera
Taxonomy articles created by Polbot